An election to the Carmarthenshire County Council was held on 9 April 1970. It was preceded by the 1967 election and was the last election prior to the reorganization of local government in Wales. Carmarthenshire County Council was merged with Cardiganshire and Pembrokeshire to form the new county of Dyfed and the first elections to the new authority were held in 1973.

Overview of the result

59 councillors were elected. The final elections to the council before dissolution saw the Independents retain control of the authority. The Plaid Cymru advance which was apparent in 1967 was halted and most candidates made little impact.

Boundary changes

There were no boundary changes at this election.

Unopposed returns

As in 1967, these were fewer in number than at most post-war elections.

Contested elections

Contests took place in the majority of wards, and Labour loast some further ground in the Llanelli area while at the same time winning back some seats lost three years previously. Labour also won two seats in Carmarthen town for the first time.

Ward results

Abergwili

Ammanford No.1

Ammanford No.2

Berwick

Burry Port East

Burry Port West

Caio

Carmarthen Division 1

Carmarthen Division 2

Carmarthen Division 3

Cenarth

Cilycwm

Conwil

Cwmamman

Felinfoel

Hengoed

Kidwelly

Laugharne

Llanarthney

Llanboidy

Llandebie North

Llandebie South

Llandilo Rural

Llandilo Urban

Llandovery

Llandyssilio

Llanedy

Llanegwad

Llanelly Division.1

Llanelly Division 2

Llanelly Division 3

Llanelly Division 4

Llanelly Division 5

Llanelly Division 6

Llanelly Division 7

Llanelly Division 8

Llanelly Division 9

Llanfihangel Aberbythych

Llanfihangel-ar-Arth

Llangadog

Llangeler

Llangendeirne

Llangennech

Llangunnor

Llanon

Llansawel

Llanstephan

Llanybyther

Myddfai

Pembrey

Pontyberem

Quarter Bach

Rhydcymerau

St Clears

St Ishmaels

Trelech

Trimsaran

Westfa

Whitland

Election of aldermen

In addition to the 59 councillors the council consisted of 19 county aldermen. Aldermen were elected by the council, and served a six-year term. Following the elections, the majority of the aldermanic seats were taken by Labour.

Retiring aldermen

A number of retiring councillors stood down to allow retiring aldermen to be returned unopposed.

References

Carmarthenshire County Council elections
Carmarthenshire